David J. Anderson (born 1956) is an American neurobiologist. He is a Howard Hughes Medical Institute investigator. His lab is located at the California Institute of Technology, where he currently holds the position of Seymour Benzer Professor of Biology, TianQiao and Chrissy Chen Leadership Chair and Director, TianQiao and Chrissy Chen Institute for Neuroscience.  Anderson is a founding adviser of the Allen Institute for Brain Research, a non-profit research institute funded by the late Paul G. Allen, and spearheaded the Institute's early effort to generate a comprehensive map of gene expression in the mouse brain.

He is the author of The Neuroscience of Emotion: A New Synthesis with Caltech neuroscientist Ralph Adolfs.

Anderson received an NSF Presidential Young Investigator Award in 1986, the 1999 Alden Spencer Award from Columbia University, and a Paul G. Allen Distinguished Investigator Award in 2010. In 2017, he won the 17th Perl-UNC Neuroscience Prize and in 2018, he won the Edward M. Scolnick Prize in Neuroscience.

Research
Anderson's work (mid 1980s–early 2000s) focused on the development and function of the nervous system, particularly the mechanism of fate determination of neural stem cells. His laboratory's current focus is to dissect genes and neural circuits underlying innate behaviors and associated emotion states, such as fear and aggression.

At Caltech, Anderson has overseen projects such as studying aggression in fruit flies. He has also studied the mechanisms of fear and touch, and the neural activity in the brains of mice during social behaviors such as mating and aggression.

Positions
He was elected a Fellow of the American Academy of Arts and Sciences in 2002. In 2007, he was elected a member of the National Academy of Sciences.

Anderson was trained by two Nobel laureates, Gunter Blobel and Richard Axel.

Select Publications

Books

References

External links
 Anderson's profile on HHMI website
 Anderson's profile at Caltech
 The David Anderson Research Group website
 

1956 births
American neuroscientists
California Institute of Technology faculty
Fellows of the American Academy of Arts and Sciences
Howard Hughes Medical Investigators
Living people
Members of the United States National Academy of Sciences
Place of birth missing (living people)
Rockefeller University alumni